Bill Spaulding (born circa 1991-92) is an American sports announcer. He is as of the 2022-23 NHL season the current play-by-play announcer for the New Jersey Devils and has announced for the Ivy League Digital Network as well as other college sports events on NBC and ESPN, including the Olympic Games.

Career
Spaulding went to Notre Dame High School in Elmira, New York where he graduated before going to Syracuse University. While studying at the S. I. Newhouse School of Public Communications at Syracuse, Spaulding worked as a Sports Director for WAER and also hosted a talk-show as well as play-by-play announcing for High School women's college sports at WJPZ-FM. During the summer months, Spaulding would also do commentary for Collegiate summer baseball games with the Wareham Gatemen of the Cape Cod Baseball League and the Geneva Red Wings of the New York Collegiate Baseball League. He would also win the Jim Nantz Award for outstanding sportscaster in 2012.

After graduating from Syracuse in 2013, he became a play-by-play announced for the Dayton Dragons minor league baseball team and eventually join the Ivy League Digital Network where he would do play-by-play commentary for Harvard and Northwestern University.

Bill Spaulding worked as a play-by-play announcer for College Hockey games as well as the Olympic Games with NBC Sports starting in 2016 as well as the 2018 Winter Olympics and 2020 Summer Olympics. Much of his commentary with NBC Sports during the Olympics include track-and-field, speed skating, ski jumping, and others.

On August 11, 2022, the MSG Network announced that Spaulding will join the network as a play-by-play announcer for the New Jersey Devils, replacing the outgoing Steve Cangialosi who did play-by-play for the Devils for eleven seasons.

Personal life
Spaulding grew up in Horseheads, New York.

References

1990s births
Living people
S.I. Newhouse School of Public Communications alumni
National Hockey League broadcasters
New Jersey Devils announcers
Olympic Games broadcasters
New Jersey Devils
People from Horseheads, New York